The Namibia African People's Democratic Organisation (NAPDO) was a political party in Namibia, based amongst the Damara people. It was founded in 1970.

In 1972 NAPDO joined the National Convention (NC, later NNC).

In 1976 NAPDO left the Namibia National Convention, and merged with the South West Africa People's Organisation (SWAPO).

References

Defunct political parties in Namibia
Political parties established in 1970
1970 establishments in South West Africa